Lionard Fernando Pajoy Ortiz (born June 7, 1981) is a Colombian striker who currently plays for Alianza Universidad.

Club career

Early Career in Colombia
Pajoy began his career with Cortulua debuting with the first team during the 2004 season. In 2005, he joined Atlético Huila and remained at the club for one year. The following season, he joined Boyacá Chicó and had his finest season scoring 12 goals in 35 matches.

As a result of his play with Boyacá Chicó, Pajoy was signed by the 2006 Colombian 1st division Champion Cúcuta Deportivo and helped Cúcuta to the semi finals of the Copa Libertadores 2007. He scored his club's 2nd goal in the away match against Nacional de Montevideo which ended in a 2–2 draw and sealed Cúcuta's semifinal spot. After three years with Cúcuta he joined Deportivo Cali during January 2010. However, he was released from the club at the end of may due to poor play. He joined Millonarios for the remainder of the 2010 season but only scored 1 goal in 15 matches.

In early 2011 he was sent on loan to newly promoted Itagüí Ditaires. While with Itagüí he recovered the form that made him a respected scorer in Colombia. On October 1, 2011, Pajoy scored Itagüí's three goals in a 3–1 victory over Real Cartagena. In his one year at the club Pajoy helped lead the club to a 9th place overall finish and a second-place finish in Torneo Finalización, in which he was one of the top scorers with 10 goals in 17 matches.

Major League Soccer
Pajoy signed with Philadelphia Union of Major League Soccer on February 8, 2012. On August 16, 2012, Pajoy was traded with an international roster spot to D.C. United in exchange for Danny Cruz. He scored his first goal for United in a 4–2 win against Chicago one week later. On September 20, Pajoy's half-volley proved the difference in a 1–0 win at his old club.

Return to Colombia
At the end of the 2013 season, Pajoy left DC after they declined the option on his contract. He would return to Colombian football for the 2014 season, signing with top flight side La Equidad on a one-year contract. Unable to find consistent playing time with the Bogotá-based club, he finished the season with just one goal from 20 league appearances.

Peru
Following the expiry of his contract with La Equidad, Pajoy moved to Peru to sign for Unión Comercio. Rediscovering his goalscoring form, Pajoy would finish the first phase of the 2015 season – the Torneo del Inca – with 7 goals from just 8 games, including 4 on his debut in a 4–2 win over Sport Loreto. However, he was unable to prevent the Nueva Cajamarca club from getting knocked out at the group stage. Continuing this form into the 2015 Apertura campaign, the Colombian scored another 8 goals to propel him to the top of the league goalscoring charts. Pajoy would remain among the league's top goalscorers for the rest of the 2015 Torneo Descentralizado, with 10 goals in 15 Clausura appearances. A hat-trick (in a 5–2 win) against bottom club Sport Loreto in the final round of fixtures would confirm his position as the league's top goalscorer with 25 goals in 39 games (scoring at a rate of once every 137 minutes), though his team would fail to qualify for the Playoff Phase.

Following his form in the 2015 season, Pajoy opted not to re-sign with Unión Comercio and instead signed a one-year deal with Alianza Lima, historically one of the most successful and popular clubs in Peru, with the ambition of helping them secure their first Peruvian championship since 2006. Just as he had with his previous club, Pajoy scored on his Alianza debut, netting a 21st-minute winner in a 2–1 win over Alianza Atlético. He remained in the headlines in the next round, being sent off in the club's 2–1 win over Deportivo Municipal. Having been suspended for round 3, he returned to action the next week against Sporting Cristal where he scored both his side's goals in a 4–2 loss.

Career statistics

Club

Updated December 31, 2017

Honors

Alianza Lima
 Peruvian Primera División: 2017

D.C. United
 Lamar Hunt U.S. Open Cup: 2013

Cúcuta
 Copa Libertadores: 2007 Semi-Finalist

References

External links
 
 
 
 

1981 births
Living people
Colombian footballers
Colombian expatriate footballers
Cortuluá footballers
Atlético Huila footballers
Boyacá Chicó F.C. footballers
Cúcuta Deportivo footballers
Deportivo Cali footballers
Millonarios F.C. players
Águilas Doradas Rionegro players
Philadelphia Union players
D.C. United players
La Equidad footballers
Unión Comercio footballers
Club Alianza Lima footballers
Categoría Primera A players
Major League Soccer players
Peruvian Primera División players
Association football forwards
Colombian expatriate sportspeople in Peru
Colombian expatriate sportspeople in the United States
Expatriate soccer players in the United States
Expatriate footballers in Peru
People from Norte de Santander Department